|}

The Quebec Stakes is a Listed flat horse race in Great Britain open to horses aged three years or older. It is run over a distance of 1 mile and 2 furlongs (2,012 metres) at Lingfield Park in December.

The race was first run in 2007.

Winners

See also 
 Horse racing in Great Britain
 List of British flat horse races

References
Racing Post: 

Flat races in Great Britain
Lingfield Park Racecourse
Open middle distance horse races
2007 establishments in England
Recurring sporting events established in 2007